The Polder tensor is a tensor introduced by Dirk Polder for the description of magnetic permeability of ferrites. The tensor notation needs to be used because ferrimagnetic materials become anisotropic in the presence of magnetizing field.

The tensor is described mathematically as:

where:

and  [kHz/(A/m)] is a gyromagnetic ratio and g is a factor between 1.9-2.4 depending on ferrite material.

References

Ferrites
Tensor physical quantities
Ferromagnetic materials
Magnetic ordering